Himalayan Forest Research Institute (HFRI) is a Research institute situated in Shimla in Himachal Pradesh. It works under the Indian Council of Forestry Research and Education (ICFRE) of the Ministry of Environment and Forests, Govt. of India.

Divisions
 Forest Ecology & Climate Change Division
 Forest Protection Division
 Silviculture & Forest Management Division
 Genetics & Tree Improvement Division
 Extension Division

See also
 Indian Council of Forestry Research and Education
 Van Vigyan Kendra (VVK) Forest Science Centres
 Social forestry in India

References

Indian forest research institutes
Indian Council of Forestry Research and Education
Ministry of Environment, Forest and Climate Change
Research institutes in Himachal Pradesh
1977 establishments in Himachal Pradesh